Carex longii, or Long's sedge, is a species of sedge found in North America that was first described by Kenneth Mackenzie in 1922.

Conservation 
Carex longii lives on the margins of wetlands in saturated or seasonally saturated soils. It is listed as Vulnerable or Imperiled across Eastern North America.

References

longii
Plants described in 1922